Black Pond Wildlife Management Area is a  New York State Wildlife Management Area (WMA) that lies on the eastern shore of Lake Ontario, and at the northern limit of an unusual region of sandy barrier beaches and lagoons. Immediately north of the WMA is the  El Dorado Beach Preserve, which is a bird refuge owned by The Nature Conservancy. North of the outlet from Black Pond to Lake Ontario, the shoreline is a weathered, flat bedrock shelf that is "calcareous" instead of sandy.

From the parking lot at road's end, the WMA has an accessible  trail and boardwalk that reaches through the interior wetlands to the sandy beach on Lake Ontario. From the terminus of the boardwalk, it is possible to walk south along the beach for about  without getting wet feet. This beach route passes out of the WMA, past the beachfront residences of Jefferson Park, through Southwick Beach State Park, and into the sizable Lakeview Wildlife Management Area. Walking north along the beach leads onto the El Dorado Beach Preserve; a hiking trail and bird-watching blinds at the Beach Preserve are normally reached by Grandjean Road, which is north of Black Pond.

Black Pond WMA, with Lakeview WMA, Deer Creek Marsh WMA, and the Sandy Pond Beach Unique Area, comprise the Eastern Lake Ontario Marshes Bird Conservation Area. The Nature Conservancy's adjacent El Dorado Beach Preserve extends this bird conservation area. Black Pond WMA, Southwick Beach State Park, Lakeview WMA, Sandy Pond Beach Natural Area, and Deer Creek Marsh WMA have been included in a New York Natural Heritage Area, the "Eastern Lake Ontario Barrier Beach and Wetland Complex".

The WMA and the Beach Preserve are in the Town of Ellisburg in Jefferson County.

See also
 List of New York state wildlife management areas
 Southwick Beach State Park

References

External links (including access information)

Wildlife management areas of New York (state)
New York State Natural Heritage Areas
Protected areas of Jefferson County, New York